Bernard Lauth (August 23, 1820 in Alsace, France – June 25, 1894) he founded the American Iron Works in 1850, and formed a partnership with B.F. Jones in 1851. In 1854, Lauth retired from the steel firm, selling his partnership to James H. Laughlin, who led the company to be renamed Jones and Laughlin Steel Company. He invented and patented the process for cold rolling of iron in 1859. In 1871, he purchased the iron furnace at Howard, Pennsylvania, where he built a rolling mill in 1882.

References

1820 births
1894 deaths
People from Bas-Rhin
French emigrants to the United States
American steel industry businesspeople
Businesspeople from Pennsylvania
People from Centre County, Pennsylvania
Engineers from Pennsylvania
19th-century French inventors
19th-century American businesspeople